Jacob John Humphrey DL (born 7 October 1978) is an English television presenter, best known for hosting Champions League and Premier League football on BT Sport, CBBC's Bamzooki, and BBC Sport's coverage of Formula 1 Grand Prix. He is the co-founder and Director of Whisper Group, and hosts the High Performance Podcast.

Since 2021 he has been a Deputy Lieutenant of Norfolk, representing the Royal Family in his home county. 

Humphrey's career in television began after leaving school. His first work for the BBC was for their children's channel CBBC, although a switch to sport from 2006 saw him become the youngest ever host of their football shows Football Focus, and later Match of the Day and Final Score. While continuing as a guest presenter on those shows, he also went on to present BBC coverage of international football. Outside of football, he has also presented BBC coverage of the Commonwealth Games and Summer Olympics, and of American Football in the Super Bowl and NFL International Series. He began presenting Grand Prix for the BBC after they regained the rights from ITV.

Humphrey has also co-hosted BBC Sports Personality of the Year, and has guest presented non-sports programmes such as The One Show for BBC One and This Morning for ITV.

Early life
Born in Peterborough, in the county of Cambridgeshire, England to Liz, a retired teacher and Rex, a retired chief executive of Age Concern Norfolk. He has one sister, Rachel and a brother, Thomas. The family moved to Norwich, Norfolk when Humphrey was nine and attended Framingham Earl High School and the Sixth Form at the Hewett School, Norwich. During his time at school he also worked as a paperboy and became interested in the media. When he was 16, Humphrey got a job at McDonald's and was sacked for poor communication skills. Later he worked in the position of a waiter.

Career

Early career
While studying for his A Level resits, Humphrey took a work experience job at ITV East of England contractor Anglia Television. Humphrey joined Anglia on a full-time basis as a runner, followed by transferring to Rapture TV where he presented the original incarnation of G@mers. Humphrey began presenting on CBBC as assistant host in Against All Odds and later as main host of Rule The School in 2001. He later became the main presenter of Against All Odds and a studio presenter for CBBC the following year.

In late 2002, he hosted CBBC's coverage of Fame Academy, along with Holly Willoughby. They also presented the 2003 celebrity edition for Comic Relief. Humphrey also presented the 2005 and 2007  Comic Relief editions of Fame Academy, with Sophie McDonnell and Caroline Flack respectively. Humphrey also presented CBBC show Against All Odds, a TV show that featured reconstructions of real life emergencies and gave First Aid advice to viewers.

Beginning in 2004, Humphrey started hosting The Saturday Show and BAMZOOKi, but these roles ended in 2005 and 2006 respectively. He was a cover continuity presenter on CiTV at Birmingham. He also presented Newsround from 2005 till 2008. He was named anchorman of children's sports show Sportsround in September 2005, beginning a series of roles related to sports. Also he was the presenter on Gimme a Break in the first series.

Sports presenting

BBC Sport 
Humphrey started presenting as a match reporter with BBC Radio 5 Live in 2005 and then presented coverage of the 2006 Commonwealth Games in Australia.

He first hosted Football Focus in November 2006, covering for regular host Manish Bhasin who was presenting coverage of the 2006 Ashes. He later covered for Bhasin again during the 2007 Cricket World Cup. Humphrey hosted Final Score when regular presenter Ray Stubbs was unable to do so. He first hosted Match of the Day for the FA Women's Cup final in May 2007, and then presented coverage of the 2007 Women's World Cup.

In October 2007, he became the BBC's first American Football host, subsequently presenting live coverages of Super Bowl XLII till Super Bowl XLVII. Humphrey presented the BBC's highlights shows for the 2008 Africa Cup of Nations and he presented the FA Women's Cup final in 2008, the final Women's Cup Final on the BBC due to the end of the FA contract. Humphrey also hosted the afternoon show at the Olympics for the BBC in Beijing in 2008, and co-hosted BBC Sports Personality of the Year from 2008 until 2011 with Gary Lineker and Sue Barker.

In 2009, he became the anchor for the BBC's Grand Prix coverage. It was widely considered a highly successful switch for Humphrey, with his hero Des Lynam naming him 2009's best sports broadcaster in his annual 'Desmonds' awards in December 2009.

In June 2012, he presented the BBC's coverage of the Euros with Alan Shearer. In July and August, Humphrey presented coverage of the 2012 Summer Olympics. He anchored slots on BBC One and BBC Three, and presented coverage from the Velodrome with Chris Boardman and Mark Cavendish.

BT Sport 
The 2013–14 football season saw the start of Humphrey's live coverage of BT Sport's Premier League programming. As well as hosting live coverage of the Premier League games, Humphrey would also be involved with the new channel's other football programming, working to mould the style of the new football programme.

In 2015 having hosted BT Sport's exclusively live Barclays Premier League football matches for the past two seasons. Humphrey would continue to host the channel's Premier League and FA Cup coverage and extend his role to include presenting exclusively live UEFA Champions League and UEFA Europa League games.

Other presenting
Humphrey presented the 2011 & 2012 New Year Live countdown programme. He also appeared in BBC One HD's 'BBC One Never Looked So Good' ad, kicking a disco ball then smiling to the camera. Humphrey also briefly hosted coverage of the 2011 Royal Wedding from a 66-year-old Lancaster bomber however was cut off due to technical difficulties with his audio.

He presents Free Speech, which began on BBC Three on 7 March 2012. From 23 October 2012, he has hosted The One Show as a stand-in presenter. He also hosted the BBC daytime game show Beat The Pack and has presented sports bulletins on BBC News Channel.

On 31 May 2013, Humphrey presented ITV's This Morning  for the first time alongside Amanda Byram. On 21 November 2014, he hosted a second episode, alongside Ruth Langsford. Humphrey presented on BBC Radio 2 for the first time overnight on 10 October 2014.

Business ventures
Along with being the co-founder of Whisper Group, and creator of The High Performance Podcast, Humphrey is also an investor and advisor to Coral Eyewear, SkiYodl, and Mission Tea.

Personal life
He lives in a Norfolk village to the south of Norwich. He married his childhood sweetheart, Harriet, in a ceremony in his home village just outside Norwich in August 2007. On 11 September 2012 he announced via Twitter that Harriet was expecting their first child. Their daughter, Florence Aurelia Alice Humphrey, was born on 21 March 2013. Since, he has had a second child, Sebastian Alexander James who was born on 1 August 2015. His son was named after F1 driver Sebastian Vettel. Harriet is employed as one of the directors and the production managers of Whisper Films.

He is a supporter of his local football team Norwich City.

Humphrey is colour-blind – a fact he revealed to much hilarity on BBC Radio 5 Live comedy sports show Fighting Talk, when talking about locking the automatic door on a train lavatory. He can not tell when the light that shows when the door is locked has gone from green to red.

He received an Honorary Doctorate of Civil Law from the University of East Anglia in July 2012.

References

External links

Official website

Jake Humphrey at the BBC

1978 births
People from Peterborough
Living people
BT Sport presenters and reporters
British children's television presenters
English television presenters
English association football commentators
English sports broadcasters
BBC sports presenters and reporters
Formula One journalists and reporters
Motorsport announcers
National Football League announcers
Olympic Games broadcasters
People educated at The Hewett School
English male journalists
English male non-fiction writers
People from Keswick, South Norfolk